Karadi Sanganna Amarappa is a member of the Bharatiya Janata Party. He is the present member of the Parliament, and won two consecutive 2014 Indian general elections & 2019 Indian general election from the Koppal (Lok Sabha constituency) in the state of Karnataka.

References

Living people
India MPs 2014–2019
Lok Sabha members from Karnataka
People from Koppal district
1950 births
Bharatiya Janata Party politicians from Karnataka
Karnataka MLAs 2008–2013
India MPs 2019–present